Petrus Palmu (born 16 July 1997) is a Finnish professional ice hockey forward who is currently playing with Linköping HC in the Swedish Hockey League (SHL). He was drafted 181st overall by the Vancouver Canucks in the 2017 NHL Entry Draft.

Playing career
Palmu played in his native Finland, as a youth with Jokipojat and Jokerit at the Junior A and B level before opting to continue his development in North America after he was selected 22nd overall in the 2014 CHL import draft by the Owen Sound Attack of the Ontario Hockey League (OHL).

Following three seasons of major junior hockey with Owen Sound and after his selection to the Vancouver Canucks in the 2017 NHL Entry Draft, Palmu opted to return to Finland to embark on his professional career, agreeing to a contract with TPS of the Liiga on May 3, 2017.

In the 2017–18 season Palmu led all-rookies within the Liiga by posting 17 goals and 36 points in 59 games. As a result, Palmu was awarded the Jarmo Wasama Memorial Trophy as the Liiga's Rookie of the Year.

On May 28, 2018, Palmu signed a three-year entry-level contract with the Vancouver Canucks of the National Hockey League (NHL). After attending the Canucks 2018 training camp, Palmu was reassigned to begin the 2018–19 season with AHL affiliate, the Utica Comets. Petrus played just 12 of 28 games with Utica, featuring heavily as a healthy scratch, before he was loaned back to TPS to continue his development for the remainder of the season on December 13, 2018.

Palmu again attended the Vancouver Canucks training camp prior to the 2019–20 season, before he was returned to Finland for a second consecutive year on loan, joining JYP Jyväskylä on 3 October 2019. In a top-line scoring role, Palmu rebounded from his previous season in collecting 14 goals and 35 points through 47 regular season games.

Entering the final season of his entry-level contract with the Canucks, having been pushed down in the depth chart and with the COVID-19 pandemic delaying the 2020–21 season, Palmu remained in Europe after he loaned by Vancouver to German club, ERC Ingolstadt of the DEL, on 23 November 2020.

Career statistics

Regular season and playoffs

International

Awards and honours

References

External links
 

1997 births
Living people
Finnish ice hockey right wingers
ERC Ingolstadt players
JYP Jyväskylä players
Linköping HC players
Mikkelin Jukurit players
Örebro HK players
Owen Sound Attack players
People from Joensuu
HC TPS players
Utica Comets players
Vancouver Canucks draft picks
Sportspeople from North Karelia